The Liberation Army of South Vietnam was a military force established by the Vietnam Labor Party in 1961 in South Vietnam. In 1962, the People's Revolutionary Party of South Vietnam separated from the Vietnamese Labor Party in terms of external appearance, openly directing the Liberation Army's military. Politically, the South Vietnamese Liberation Army was under the direction of the National Front for the Liberation of South Vietnam and the Provisional Revolutionary Government of the Republic of South Vietnam. The military forces from the North to the South of Vietnam, although collectively known as the Liberation Army of South Vietnam, still use the unit names, military badges and War flag of the Vietnam People's Army.

After the 1973 Paris Agreement, the forces of the South Vietnamese Liberation Army were merged into the Vietnam People's Army one by one. This merger was completed in 1975 and 1976. Although administratively the Liberation Army of South Vietnam and the People's Army of Vietnam are two different armies, they share the same leadership and can completely merge, split, and supplement forces according to their needs a unified principle. After 1975, the Vietnam Labor Party acknowledged leading both the South Liberation Army and the Vietnam People's Army during the war. The National Front for the Liberation of South Vietnam and the Provisional Revolutionary Government of the Republic of South Vietnam also received the secret direction of the Labor Party of Vietnam.

The South Vietnamese Liberation Army is under the open direction of the High Command of the Armed Forces for the Liberation of South Vietnam, and secretly under the direction of the Politburo of Vietnam Labor Party and the Central Military Commission of the Vietnamese People's Army, Central Department for South Vietnam, the High Command of the Armed Forces for the Liberation of South Vietnam. Regarding secrecy, the Central Department for South Vietnam and the High Command of the Armed Forces for the Liberation of South Vietnam directed in the area B2 (Ninh Thuan to Ca Mau).

Organization 
According to 1954 Geneva agreements, the Viet Cong were not compulsorily removed to the North because it was a political entity, not a military force. North Vietnamese support for the Viet Cong to establish the NLF forces was allowed on the basis that it remained a militia in the South. The LASV was recognized as the official force on February 15, 1961 by North Vietnam. The LASV originally carried out operations ostensibly to protect South Vietnamese citizens from offensives by the Republic of Vietnam and the United States. Most early soldiers in the LASV were South Vietnamese. However, casualties of war forced North Vietnam to provide volunteers for the LASV. As a result, many people mistakenly believed that the LASV was a part of the People's Army of Vietnam. North Vietnam and other communist nations recognised the LASV as the primary militarily force in South Vietnam and considered the People's Army of Vietnam to be its parent organization.

Units of the Vietnam People's Army and the South Vietnamese Liberation Army in South Vietnam in April 1975:

1st Corps (PAVN) has three infantry divisions: the 308th Division, the 312th Division, and the 320B Division. ( Particularly, Division 308 remained in the North as a strategic reserve force) . 45th Artillery Regiment (Doan Tat Thang); 202 Armored Tank Brigade;...

Army Corps 2 of the Vietnam People's Army includes Division 304, Division 325, Division 324; 673rd Air Defense Division, 164th Artillery Brigade, 203rd Tank Brigade,...assigned to the 3rd Division from the 5th Military Region and some units withdrawn from the 4th Military Region (North Vietnam)

3rd Corps (PAVN) includes: 10th Division, 316th Division, 320th Division, 2 artillery regiments (40 and 675), 3 anti-aircraft regiments (232, 234 and 593), 198th Commando Regiment...

4th Army Corps (B2) has 7th Infantry Division (LASV), 9th Infantry Division (LASV) and military units: 24th Artillery Regiment, 71st Air Defense Regiment, ...added Division 341 (Song Lam Division) of Military Region 4 (North Vietnam)

Division 232 (B2) includes the main 5th and 9th Divisions of the Region (LASV), and Phuoc Long Division (originally the C30B group); six independent regiments 16, 88, 24...After being reinforced by 8th Division (Military Region 8).

316th Infantry Division in western Nghe An province, Ha Tinh province (North Vietnam - Military Region 4). Division 341 stands in the south of Military Region 4. These two divisions are in the strategic mobile reserve of the Ministry. F341 assigned to the 4th Army Corps at the end of April 1975.

The main block of the Tri - Thien Military Region (B4- South Vietnam) consists of three infantry regiments (4th, 6th and 27th regiments)...The main force of Military Region 5 (B1- South Vietnam) includes Division 2 and Division 3...Under the Command of Military Region 5, there are also two artillery regiments (572 and 576), 573 anti-aircraft regiment...

The main force of Military Zone 6 (B2) has the 812th Infantry Regiment, the 130th Combat Support Battalion and the 200C commando battalion. The main troops of the military zones in the South (B2) are concentrated and built into four divisions and two infantry regiments: Division 3 belongs to the Regional Command, Division 4 belongs to Military Region 9, Division 8 belongs to Military Region 8, Division 6 belongs to Military Region 7 and two Gia Dinh regiments (1 and 2) belong Military Command of Saigon - Gia Dinh.

Command mechanism:

Public:

The National Front for the Liberation of South Vietnam and the Provisional Revolutionary Government led politically

The People's Revolutionary Party of South Vietnam and the Regional Command command military affairs throughout the South

Secret:

The Politburo and Central Military Commission of the Labor Party of Vietnam, the General Command of the Vietnam People's Army direct the entire South, directly on the battlefields B1, B3, B4, B5.

The Central Department of the South, the Military Commission of the South, the Command of the Region on the battlefield B2, under the general direction of the Labor Party of Vietnam

The Politburo, the Secretariat of the Labor Party and directly the Central Department of the South of the Labor Party secretly directed the National Front for Liberation and the Provisional Revolutionary Government.

After the reunification of Vietnam in 1975, the Liberation Army of South Vietnam was merged into the People's Army of Vietnam in 1976. In fact, all the Viet Cong army forces had been incorporated into the North Vietnamese army since early 1975.

Developments
In January 1961, the militia in South Vietnam became the official force there. On February 15, 1961, North Vietnam recognized it as the main battle force in South Vietnam. At the end of 1961, there were 24,500 soldiers and 100,000 militants in the LASV. The LASV had 11 battalions, with commanding generals  Trần Văn Trà, Hoàng Văn Thái, Lê Trọng Tấn, Lê Đức Anh, Nguyễn Thị Định, and others.

The LASV initially confined its operations to rural areas due to Ngô Đình Diệm's tough crackdown on Communist sympathizers. However, the number of soldiers still went up to 64,000 in 1963. As the result, regiments were established. Since 1964, North Vietnam started providing soldiers for the LASV by voluntary mans. The number of the LASV soldiers reached over 290,000 in December 1974, including 90,000 from the South.

The South Vietnamese and United States forces outnumbered the PAVN by at least 7 to 1 until 1965; even after 1965 the coalition forces still outnumbered the PAVN by 3 to 1.

The LASV also included urban fighting forces, especially in Saigon. These forces had mission of carrying out cover attacks against South Vietnam and American forces and its allies in urban areas, especially in Saigon. The urban special force in Saigon is famous in the 1968 Tet offensive.

Units of the Vietnam People's Army and the South Vietnamese Liberation Army in South Vietnam in April 1975:

1st Corps (PAVN) has three infantry divisions: the 308th Division, the 312th Division, and the 320B Division. ( Particularly, Division 308 remained in the North as a strategic reserve force) . 45th Artillery Regiment (Doan Tat Thang); 202 Armored Tank Brigade;...

Army Corps 2 of the Vietnam People's Army includes Division 304, Division 325, Division 324; 673rd Air Defense Division, 164th Artillery Brigade, 203rd Tank Brigade,...assigned to the 3rd Division from the 5th Military Region and some units withdrawn from the 4th Military Region (North Vietnam)

3rd Corps (PAVN) includes: 10th Division, 316th Division, 320th Division, 2 artillery regiments (40 and 675), 3 anti-aircraft regiments (232, 234 and 593), 198th Commando Regiment...

4th Army Corps (B2) has 7th Infantry Division (LASV), 9th Infantry Division (LASV) and military units: 24th Artillery Regiment, 71st Air Defense Regiment, ...added Division 341 (Song Lam Division) of Military Region 4 (North Vietnam)

Division 232 (B2) includes the main 5th and 9th Divisions of the Region (LASV), and Phuoc Long Division (originally the C30B group); six independent regiments 16, 88, 24...After being reinforced by 8th Division (Military Region 8).

316th Infantry Division in western Nghe An province, Ha Tinh province (North Vietnam - Military Region 4). Division 341 stands in the south of Military Region 4. These two divisions are in the strategic mobile reserve of the Ministry. F341 assigned to the 4th Army Corps at the end of April 1975.

The main block of the Tri - Thien Military Region (B4- South Vietnam) consists of three infantry regiments (4th, 6th and 27th regiments)...The main force of Military Region 5 (B1- South Vietnam) includes Division 2 and Division 3...Under the Command of Military Region 5, there are also two artillery regiments (572 and 576), 573 anti-aircraft regiment...

The main force of Military Zone 6 (B2) has the 812th Infantry Regiment, the 130th Combat Support Battalion and the 200C commando battalion. The main troops of the military zones in the South (B2) are concentrated and built into four divisions and two infantry regiments: Division 3 belongs to the Regional Command, Division 4 belongs to Military Region 9, Division 8 belongs to Military Region 8, Division 6 belongs to Military Region 7 and two Gia Dinh regiments (1 and 2) belong Military Command of Saigon - Gia Dinh.

Main army - infantry - in South Vietnam in 1975:

308th Division (founded in 1949 in North Vietnam, participated in the Dien Bien Phu campaign and the Vietnam War, in 1975 as a reserve force)

Division 312 (founded in 1951 in North Vietnam, participated in the Dien Bien Phu campaign and the Vietnam war, in 1975 in the 1st Corps formation to participate in the Ho Chi Minh campaign, north wing)

Division 320B, established in 1951 in North Vietnam as the 320th Division, in 1965, the 320th division was split into 2 divisions with the designations F320A and F320B, of which the F320B belonged to Corps 1 (rebranded) became the 390th Division in 1973).

The 304th Division was established in 1950 in North Vietnam, participated in the Dien Bien Phu campaign, in 1974 was part of the 2nd Army Corps

Division 325 was established in 1951 with 3 regiments in Quang Binh, Quang Tri, Thua Thien, in 1974 in the 2nd Army Corps

The 324th Division was established in Thanh Hoa province in 1955 based on the armed forces of the 5th Inter-Region which were withdrawn to the North. In 1975, the division was in the 2nd corps but later moved to the 4th military zone.

The 316th Division was established in 1951 in North Vietnam, participated in the Dien Bien Phu campaign, in 1975 was in the 3rd corps but later moved to the 2nd military zone.

Division 320A, established in 1951 in North Vietnam, split in 1965, division 320A in the 3rd Corps in 1975.

The 10th Division was established in 1972 by the General Command of the Vietnam People's Army based on the main regiments of the Central Highlands Front, in 1975 was part of the 3rd corps, participated in the Ho Chi Minh campaign, northwest wing.

The 7th Division was established in 1966 in South Vietnam, on the basis of the 2 Regiments 141 and 165 of the old 312th Division in the North. After that, the formation had many other regiments marching southwards, subordinated to the division. Regiment: 16th Regiment (101st Regiment, 325th Division), 14th Regiment (18th Regiment, 325th Division), 209th Regiment (312th Division), 95C Regiment (9th Division)... In 1974, The group was in the 4th Army Corps (B2).

The 9th Division was established in 1965 in South Vietnam, on the basis of two regiments Q761 and Q762. Soldiers in the formation of the division consisted of all three regions, the largest number of which were Southerners who had participated in Dong Khoi. In 1974, the division was in the 4th Army Corps (B2). In 1975 the division was in Division 232 for some time.

The 6th Division was established in 1974 under Military Region 7, participated in the Ho Chi Minh campaign in the 4th Army Corps, then disbanded.

The 5th Division was established in 1965 in South Vietnam from 2 regiments Q.764 (E4) and Q.765 (E55), in 1975 was part of Division 232 for a period of time, participating in the Ho Chi Minh campaign,  wing west-south, then to Military Region 7.
The 3rd Division was established in 1965 under the 5th Military Region, consisting of the 2nd Regiment (a "original Viet Cong" regiment completely recruited from the local), the 12th Regiment (former the 18th Regiment of the 325th Division with the traditional tradition from the Indochina War.February 1965, regiment departed for the battlefield), 22nd Regiment, 21st Regiment

The 2nd Division was established in 1965 in the 5th Military Region, on the basis of the 1st regiment in Quang Nam, Quang Ngai, the 21st regiment of the North and the addition of the 70th infantry battalion...In 1975, it belonged to the 3rd Army Corps. When the 3rd Army Corps marched to the South, the 2nd Division stayed in the 5th Military Region.

The 3rd Division belongs to the Regional Command (B2) (also called Phuoc Long division or 303 division, in Legion 232)
The 4th Division belongs to the 9th Military Region
the 8th Division belongs to the 8th Military Region, established 22 October 1974...

The 812th Infantry Regiment was established in 1950, formerly known as 120 Company, local army zone 6, developed into the main 840 battalion of Military Region 6, operating mainly on the southernmost battlefield of Central Vietnam. After the Geneva agreement was signed, the 840th battalion was ordered to assemble to the North. In 1974, the 6th Military Region Command decided to establish the 812th Infantry Regiment.

Gia Dinh Regiment was established in 1959 in South Vietnam. On April 1, 1975, the unit was officially named Gia Dinh Regiment.
The 341st Division was established in 1972, belongs to Military Region 4
The 88th Infantry Regiment was established in 1949 in North Vietnam and split in 1965 into Regiment 88B and Regiment 88A. Regiment 88A was assigned to the South. In March 1975, the Regiment separated from the 8th Military Region to consolidate its forces, participating in the Ho Chi Minh campaign as the 5th wing of the 232nd division. After that, the 88th Regiment belonged to the 302nd Division, the 7th Military Region.
The 6th Infantry Regiment belongs to the Tri - Thien Military Region, established 1965
The 31st Division was formed on 11 July 1974 in the Plain of Jars (Laos)

The Liberation Army of South Vietnam merged into the People's Army of Vietnam after the reunification of Vietnam by the 1976 general election.

Equipment

The Viet Cong established the NLF in order to help create a Communist state in South Vietnam. PAVN forces that went to the South were sent with the express mission to aid the NLF. The NLF army had different uniforms, flags and badges to those of the PAVN.

Small arms

Handguns
 Tokarev TT-33 – Soviet-designed single-action 7.62×25mm semi-automatic pistol. More commonly used were the Chinese variants of the T33, known as the Type-51 and Type-54. Carried by PAVN and Viet-Cong officers, it accepted an 8-round single stack box magazine.
 Makarov PM – Soviet-designed double/single-action 9×18mm Makarov (9.5×18mm) semi-automatic pistol. Reproduced in China as the Type-59, this small and reliable pistol became the standard sidearm of communist forces in Europe and Asia. Utilizing a simple blow-back action, this self-loading pistol fed from an 8-round single stack box magazine.
 P-64 CZAK handgun
 Nagant M1895 revolver
 Mauser C96 (from the Soviet Union)
 Walther P38 (from the Soviet Union)

Automatic and semi-automatic rifles
 AK-47 and AKM assault rifles (from the Soviet Union and Warsaw Pact countries)
 Type 56 assault rifle (from the People's Republic of China)
 Vz. 58 assault rifle (from the Czechoslovakia)
 Type 63 assault rifle
 Sturmgewehr 44 assault rifle (captured by the Soviets during World War II and provided to the PAVN and the LASV as military aid)
 SVD-63 Very limited use semi-automatic marksman rifle, also known as the "Dragunov" sniper rifle
MAS-49 rifle  Captured French rifle from first Indochina War, used by PAVN throughout the 1950s and up to the mid 1960s
M16A1, M14 American assault rifle captured from U.S and ARVN forces.
 SKS semi-automatic carbine, also known as Simonov

Bolt-action rifles
MAS-36 rifle Captured French rifle from first Indochina War, used by PAVN in earlier stages of the Vietnam War
 Mosin–Nagant bolt-action rifles and carbines (from the Soviet Union, Warsaw Pact countries, and the People's Republic of China)
 Mauser Kar98k bolt-action rifle (many of the Mausers used by the PAVN and the LASV were from rifles captured from the French during the First Indochina War and rifles provided to them by the Soviets as military aid)
 Type 99 Rifle captured from the Japanese during World War II

Submachine guns
 K-50M submachine gun (Vietnamese edition, based on Chinese version of Russian PPSh-41, produced under license)
 Škorpion vz. 61 sumbmachine gun from Czechoslovakia
 PPSh-41 submachine gun (both Soviet and Chinese versions)
 MP-40 German sub machine captured during World War II by the Soviet Army, supplied to the Viet Cong in limited amounts
 MAT-49 submachine gun – Captured from the French by the North Vietnamese, many were converted to 7.62×25mm.
 PM-63 Polish submachine gun
 MP-38 submachine gun (captured by the Soviets during World War II; provided to the PAVN and the NLF as military aid)
 PPS-43 Russian submachine gun
 Type 100 (use from Indochina war)

Machine guns
 Type 99 LMG
 RPD light machine gun
 Degtyarev DP light machine gun
 SG-43/SGM medium machine guns (including Chinese copies)
 RPK light machine gun
 PK machine gun Very limited use.
 MG-34 light machine gun (captured by the Soviets during World War II; provided to the PAVN and the NLF as military aid)
 MG-42 medium machine gun (captured by the Soviets during World War II; provided to the PAVN and the NLF as military aid)
 Uk vz. 59 general-purpose machine gun
 DShK heavy machine gun
 PM M1910 heavy machine gun

Grenades and other explosives
 F1 grenade
 Type 67 stick grenade
 RG-42 grenade
 RGD-5 grenade
 9K32 Strela-2 anti-aircraft weapon
 RPG-2 anti-tank weapon (both Soviet and locally produced B-40 and B-50 variants used)
 RPG-7 anti-tank weapon
 Type 69 RPG anti-tank weapon

Flamethrowers
 LPO-50 flamethrower (limited use)

Artillery 
 ZPU-4 quad 14.5 mm anti-aircraft machine gun
 ZU-23 twin 23 mm anti-aircraft cannon
 M1939 37 mm anti-aircraft gun
 S-60 57 mm anti-aircraft gun
 85 mm air defense gun M1939 (52-K)
 100 mm air defense gun KS-19

 82-PM-41 82mm mortar
107 mm M1938 mortar
M1938 120mm mortar
M1943 160mm mortar
 Type 63 107mm rocket launcher
 BM-21 Grad 122mm rocket launcher
122 mm Katyusha rockets
 BM-25 (MRL) limited numbers
 122 mm gun M1931/37 (A-19)
 122 mm howitzer M1938 (M-30)
 D-74 122 mm Field Gun
 130 mm towed field gun M1954 (M-46)
 152 mm howitzer M1943 (D-1)
 152 mm towed gun-howitzer M1955 (D-20)

Aircraft weapons
 Gryazev-Shipunov GSh-23
 Nudelman-Rikhter NR-30
 Nudelman N-37
 Nudelman-Rikhter NR-23

Activities
The Viet Cong established the NLF army in order to create the status of independence with North Vietnam and People's Army of Vietnam. PAVN forces that were sent south had the express mission of supporting NLF operations in the south. The NLF forces had different uniforms, flags and badges to those of the PAVN. The People's Liberation Armed Forces of South Vietnam was recognized as the main battle force of the communist coalition in the Vietnam war by North Vietnam and other communist nations.

In Vietnam war, members of the NLF army had differing and irregular uniforms, depending on circumstances.

There are few traits to distinguish between Liberation Army of South Vietnam (LASV) and People's Army of Vietnam (PAVN) forces. Over half of LASV and PAVN soldiers were members of the Labor Party of Vietnam, the old name of the Communist Party of Vietnam. However, LASV and PAVN forces used different flags. PAVN troops carried the North Vietnamese flag, while LASV troops carried the National Liberation Front flag. The PAVN was under the leadership of the Northern government, while LASV was under the leadership of the NLF. After the collapse of South Vietnam, the Liberation Army of South Vietnam merged into the People's Army of Vietnam. The event marked the end of the Vietnam War and the start of a transition period, followed by the formal reunification of Vietnam under the Socialist Republic through government-controlled elections in 1976.
 

For propaganda purposes of dividing forces of enemies, the ARVN and the US army always said that the LASV was comprehensively independent to the People's Army of Vietnam.

In South Vietnam, members of the Communist Party of Vietnam held membership of the People's Revolutionary Party.

According to American documents, the main battle force in South Vietnam was the NLF, not the People's Army of Vietnam.

List of military victories
Battle of Ap Bac - 2 January, 1963
Battle of Hiep Hoa - 22 November, 1963
Attack on USNS Card - May 2, 1964
Battle of An Lão - December 7–9, 1964
Battle of Binh Gia - December 28, 1964 - January 1 1965 
Attack on Camp Holloway
Battle of Ba Gia
Battle of Dong Xoai
Operation Starlite (both sides claimed victory)
Battle of Gang Toi
Battle of Xa Cam My
Attack on the SS Baton Rouge Victory
Battle of Ong Thanh
Attack on Cu Chi Base Camp
Battle of Snuol
Battle of FSB Mary Ann
Battle of Loc Ninh
Battle of Phước Long
Ho Chi Minh campaign
Battle of Ban Me Thuot
Hue–Da Nang Campaign
Fall of Saigon

Significant leaders

Commanders

Political Commissars

Chiefs of Staff

Other leaders

Battle forces
If a LASV unit has the same name with a PAVN unit, the LASV name will have the letter "B" added after the unit number.

 Tây Nguyên Corps (Main battle force in Central Highlands area)
 Cửu Long Corps (Main battle force in Mekong Delta area)
 Division 1 (Main battle force in Central Highlands area)
 Division 2 (Main battle force in South Central Coast area)
 Division 3 Sao Vàng (Golden Star) (Main battle force in South Central Coast area)
 Division 4 (Main battle force in the South)
 Division 5 (Main battle force in Mekong Delta area)
 Division 6 (Main battle force in Southeastern area)
 Division 7 (Main battle force in the South)
 Division 8 (Main battle force in Mekong Delta area)
 Division 9 (Main battle force in the South)
 Division 10 (Main battle force in Central Highlands area)
 Division 31
 Division 303 (Main battle force in the South)
 Division 304B (Viet Cong)
 Division 308B (Viet Cong)
 Division 324B (Viet Cong)
 Division 325 (Main battle force in Central Highlands area)
 Special forces Division 100 (Viet Cong)
 Special forces Division 305

References

History of South Vietnam
National liberation armies
Rebellions in Vietnam
Guerrilla organizations
Viet Cong